is a horishi (tattoo artist), specializing in Japanese traditional full-body tattoos, or "suits," called Irezumi or Horimono.

Biography
Nakano was inspired when he saw a Yakuza (Japanese gangster) with a full-body tattoo in a public bathhouse when he was a young boy, "about eleven or twelve." This inspired him to visit legendary tattoo artist Yoshitsugu Muramatsu, also known as Shodai Horiyoshi of Yokohama. Nakano got his own tattoo from Horiyoshi II—Shodai Horiyoshi's son—and lead to Nakano becoming Horiyoshi I's apprentice at age 25.

Horiyoshi III is the second tattooist to be granted that honorific title, which passes from master to apprentice. The tattooist affixation Hori means to engrave or "to carve." Muramatsu bestowed this title upon Nakano in 1971.

His wife, Mayumi Nakano, is the general manager of his public "Tattoo Museum" located close to the Yokohama Station, which he founded in 2000.

Works

At Horiyoshi's studio in Yokohama, Japan, tattoos are outlined mostly freehand using an electric needle. He did the outlining by hand until the late 1990s. His friendship with Don Ed Hardy, started in the mid-1980s, lead to Horiyoshi's adoption of electric machines.

Shading and color is added using the traditional tebori, or Japanese hand tattooing, technique. He restricts his motifs to the classical repertoire of the vast variety of traditional Japanese stories and designs: peonies, koi, dragons, tenyo (she-angels), etc. Horiyoshi feels responsible for keeping the classic repertoire alive, "one prick at a time."

Horiyoshi III's work can cost tens of thousands of dollars, and may require weekly hour-long visits over the course of several years to complete.

His work is now limited to finishing existing clients' tattoos.

Among Horiyoshi III's published works are the following books: Ed Hardy published "Tattoo designs of Japan", Nihonshuppansha published 36 Ghosts, 108 Heroes of the Suikoden, 100 Demons, 58 Musha, The Namakubi (a collection of drawings of severed heads), former American-Japanese apprentice Horitaka has published books on the masters work which are "Bushido", "Tattoos of the floating world", "Studying Horiyoshi 3", "Dragons by Horiyoshi3", "The Horiyoshi3 sketchbook", "Horiyoshi3 photobook". Former German apprentice Horikitsune, published Horiyoshi III's books between 2009 and 2015 under the publishing label Kofuu-Senju Publications Ltd. Now renamed Kosei Publications LTD. which were "Ryushin", "Kokoro", "Osen", "Osen 2". Tattoolife press published his "Ryuki" dragon book in 2016.

An exhibition of Horiyoshi's silk scroll paintings named 'Kokoro' organised by former German apprentice Horikitsune and Italian Tattooer Claudia dei Sabe: 'The Art of Horiyoshi III' was on display at Somerset House in London, 21 March – 1 July 2012 http://www.somersethouse.org.uk/visual-arts/kokoro-the-art-of-horiyoshi-iii

Other exhibitions: Harajuku Tokyo, the "Korouten exhibit" in which Horiyoshi III partners with fellow artists the like of Hajime Sorayama, usually every October.

Horiyoshi III now only has one, last apprentice, his own son Souryou Horiyoshi IV which means heir.

The master strongly advises that all former apprentices are no longer part of his family. These were - amongst a few others: Horikara (Mikado), Horitora (P.Chuo), Horihito, Horinao, Horitaka (T.Kitamura), Horitomo (K.Kitamura), Horikiku, Horiken and Horikitsune (A.Reinke).

References

Further reading

External links
 
Japanese Traditional Art with World-Class Appeal -Irezumi・TATTOO-“Oukoshisei” - Irezumi by Horiyoshi III
 

1946 births
Japanese tattoo artists
Living people